PM2FGI (105.8 FM), broadcasting as Most 105.8 or simply Most, is an Indonesian radio station broadcasting from Jakarta. It is owned and operated by Mahaka Media under its radio arm Mahaka Radio Integra, and airs a Classic hits format.

History
Inaugurated on April 3, 1983, morning as Radio Ramako on 738 AM, it was located in Jl. Keamanan No.39, Jakarta. On 27 November 1985, it began its broadcast on FM via 106.15, and moved its headquarters to Jl. Empu Sendok No.12, Kebayoran Baru. (Later become Broadcasting Center) In 1993, it moved to BTN Tower 19th floor. The audio after the move became softer, so listeners can hear the music softer. On April 3, 2001, it was relaunched as an interactive radio within a new image, “Delivering The Most Trending News”.

The radio moved to its current frequency, 105.8 FM, which has been used since August 2004. 

In June 2003, Most Radio 106.15 started a new program called Rock Weekend, playing only classic rock music every Saturday.

Announcers

 Arlingga Panega & Indy Rahmawati
 Diandra Canti
 Andry Eswe
 Esna Ardianny & Akbarry Madjid
 Dodo Harahap
 Ryan Ardhiana
 Justine Viddy

Programme

Current Programme
All time in WIB/UTC+7.
Most Radio broadcasts 24 hours. Most Radio plays automated music out of on-air time.  Daily programs include:

 06.00-10.00: Prime Time
 11.00-14.00: Most Daily
 16.00-20.00: Drive Time
 20.00-24.00: After Hours
 06-00-24.00: Rock Weekend
 06-00-24.00: Club Weekend

References

External links 
 Official site

Radio stations in Jakarta
Classic hits radio stations
Rock radio stations
Mahaka Media